John Radford Young (born 8 April 1799, in Southwark – 5 March 1885, in Peckham) was an English mathematician, professor and author, who was almost entirely self-educated. He was born of humble parents in London. At an early age he became acquainted with Olinthus Gilbert Gregory, who perceived his mathematical ability and assisted him in his studies. In 1823, while working in a private establishment for the deaf, he published An Elementary Treatise on Algebra with a dedication to Gregory. This treatise was followed by a series of elementary works, in which, following in the steps of Robert Woodhouse, Young familiarized English students with continental methods of mathematical analysis.

In 1833, he was appointed Professor of Mathematics at Belfast College. When Queen's College, Belfast, opened in 1849, the presbyterian party in control there prevented Young's reappointment as Professor in the new establishment. From that time he devoted himself more completely to the study of mathematical analysis, and made several original discoveries.

In 1847, he published in the Transactions of the Cambridge Philosophical Society a paper "On the Principle of Continuity in reference to certain Results of Analysis", and, in 1848, in the Transactions of the Royal Irish Academy a paper "On an Extension of a Theorem of Euler". As early as 1844, he had discovered and published a proof of Newton's rule for determining the number of imaginary roots in an equation. In 1866, he completed his proof, publishing in The Philosophical Magazine a demonstration of a principle which in his earlier paper he had assumed as axiomatic. In 1868, he contributed to the Proceedings of the Royal Irish Academy a memoir "On the Imaginary Roots of Numerical Equations".

Young died at Peckham on 5 March 1885. He was married and had at least two sons and four daughters.

Works
 An Elementary Treatise on Algebra 1823, 1832, 1834
 Elements of Geometry 1827
 Elements of Analytical Geometry 1830 
 An Elementary Essay on the Computation of Logarithms 1830
 The Elements of the Differential Calculus 1831
 The Elements of the Integral Calculus 1831
 The Elements of Mechanics, comprehending Statics and Dynamics 1832
 Elements of Plane and Spherical Trigonometry 1833
 Theory and Solution of Algebraical Equations 1843 (1st edition: 1835)
 Mathematical Dissertations for the Use of Students in the Modern Analysis 1841
 On the General Principles of Analysis, Part I.: The Analysis of Numerical Equations 1850
 An Introductory Treatise on Mensuration 1850
 An Introduction to Algebra and to the Solution of Numerical Equations 1851
 Rudimentary Treatise on Arithmetic 1858, 1882
 A Compendious Course of Mathematics 1855
 The Theory and Practice of Navigation and Nautical Astronomy 1856, 1882
 Navigation and Nautical Astronomy, 1858
 The Mosaic Cosmogony not “adverse to Modern Science 1861
 Science elucidative of Scripture and not antagonistic to it 1863
 Modern Scepticism Viewed in Relation to Modern Science 1865

References

 

This article is based on a public domain article from Dictionary of National Biography 1885-1900, Vol.63.External links

 E. I. Carlyle, rev. Alan Yoshioka, "Young, John Radford (1799–1885)", Oxford Dictionary of National Biography, Oxford University Press, 2004.
 John Radford Young, Michael Floy Elements of Geometry with Notes 1833
 John Radford Young, Key to the Introduction to Algebra 1854, full-length solutions to An Introduction to Algebra''
 John Radford Young, Sir John Francis Twisden, Alexander Jardine (Esq.), The Mathematical Sciences 1860

1799 births
1885 deaths
19th-century English mathematicians
Algebraic geometers
British geometers
Mathematical analysts